Elizabeth Kwon (born 1986) is an American figure skater. She is the 1999 US Junior national pewter medalist and 1998 Novice national champion. Kwon placed 2nd in the 1999 Junior Grand Prix event in Ostrava and seventh in Slovenia. Kwon was forced to retire due to injury. As an intermediate-level skater, Kwon was featured in Christine Brennan's book Edge of Glory. Brennan wrote that Kwon was working on a triple axel.

As of April 2007, Elizabeth is the Inter-collegiate Ladies National Senior Champ. She skates for Miami University (Ohio).

Results

 J = Junior level; N = Novice level

References
http://espn.go.com/skating/s/kwon.html

American female single skaters
American people of Korean descent
Living people
1986 births
21st-century American women